Lynx Mountain is a mountain peak in the Canadian Rockies. It is located on the Continental Divide between the provinces of Alberta and British Columbia, in the Cushina Ridge of the Continental Ranges. It was named by Lucius Quincy Coleman for the remains of a lynx they found on the ice of the nearby Coleman Glacier in 1908.

The Lynx Formation, a stratigraphic unit of the Western Canada Sedimentary Basin, was named for the mountain by Charles Doolittle Walcott in 1913.

See also
 List of peaks on the British Columbia–Alberta border
 List of mountains in the Canadian Rockies

References

Three-thousanders of Alberta
Three-thousanders of British Columbia
Mountains of Jasper National Park
Mount Robson Provincial Park
Canadian Rockies